Congreve (1924–1944) was an Argentine Thoroughbred racehorse and one of the most influential sires in South America. He was a bay stallion by Copyright (GB) (by Tracery, who was sired by Rock Sand) his dam Per Noi by Perrier (GB).

Racing record
Congreve raced over four seasons. During this time, he started 18 times for 11 wins and 5 places with winnings of 247,571 pesos.

Stud career
The Haras Ojo de Agua stud in Argentina already had a good broodmare band when it purchased Congreve for stud duties.

Congreve was the leading sire in Argentine on seven occasions, ranked twice second, and was also a top broodmare sire, topping that list five times., Congreve was best known in North America for siring Kayak II, a major stakes winner.

Congreve sired six Argentine Derby winners: Ix (1935), Quemaita (1937), Embrujo (1939), La Mission (1940), Avestruz (1943) and Churrinche (1944). The 1951 winner, Yatasto, was two generations removed from Congreve. During his stud career he sired over 600 winners in Argentina with winnings of over 5,567,992 pesos.

Pedigree

External links
 Congreve's pedigree and racing stats

References

1924 racehorse births
1944 racehorse deaths
Racehorses trained in Argentina
Racehorses bred in Argentina
Thoroughbred family 1-o
Chefs-de-Race